The 2017 4. deild karla season was the 5th since its establishment. The first match of the season was played on 19 May and the season concluded on 16 September with the promotion play-off final. KH and Augnablik were promoted to 2018 3. deild karla

Overview before the season
33 teams are participating in the league, including two relegated from the 2016 3. deild karla.

Relegated from 2016 3. deild karla
KFR
KFS
New teams that didn't participate during 2016 4. deild karla
Álafoss
Drangey
Elliði
Hrunamenn
Kórdrengir
SR
Úlfarnir

Group A

Stadium and locations

League table

Results

Top goalscorers

Group B

Stadium and locations

League table

Results

Top goalscorers

Group C

Stadium and locations

League table

Results

Top goalscorers

Group D

Stadium and locations

League table

Results

Top goalscorers

Promotion playoffs
The top two teams from each of the four groups qualify for the promotion playoffs. There are three rounds of matches, quarter-finals, semi-finals and the final. There's also a play-off to decide third and fourth place. The quarter-finals and semi-finals are two-legged knockout stages, i.e. winners are decided over two legs. Tie-breakers for the knockout matches over two legs are: 1) aggregate score from the two legs, 2) away goals, 3) extra time, 4) penalties. The two semi-final winners, and the finalists, will gain promotion to 2018 3. deild karla. The final winner will become champion of 4. deild karla.

Quarter-finals

First leg

Second leg

Augnablik won 4-3 on aggregate.

Álftanes won 4-2 on aggregate.

KH won 8-2 on aggregate.

Kórdrengir won 3-2 on aggregate.

Semi-finals

First leg

Second leg

Augnablik won 5-2 on aggregate

KH won 2-1 on aggregate

Third place match

Final

KH and Augnablik were both promoted to 3. deild karla

Notes

References

External links

Iceland
Iceland
5